John Randolph Neal (November 26, 1836 – March 26, 1889) was an American politician and a member of the United States House of Representatives for Tennessee's 3rd congressional district.

Biography
Neal was born near Clinton, Tennessee in Anderson County son of John O'Brien and Permelia Young Neal. He attended the common schools and Hiwasse College in Monroe County, Tennessee. He graduated from Emory and Henry College in Emory, Virginia in 1858. He taught school at Post Oak Springs and studied law; was admitted to the bar in 1859, and commenced practice in Athens, Tennessee. At the beginning of the war, he married Mary E. C. Brown, daughter of Franklin Brown. They had three children; Dr. John R. Neal, Jr., Professor of Law at the University of Tennessee, and Scopes Trial attorney; Commander George F. Neal, U. S. N. and D. S. O. from King George V for distinguished service during World War I for sinking a German submarine, and Navy Cross from Congress for loyal service; and Amanda Neal Wheelock.

Career
During the Civil War, Neal enlisted in the Confederate Army and was elected captain of a Cavalry troop, which afterward became a part of the 16th Battalion, Tennessee Cavalry. He was subsequently promoted to lieutenant colonel of the battalion. He taught school for several years, settled at Rhea Springs, Tennessee, and continued the practice of law. He was a member of the Tennessee House of Representatives in 1874. He served in the Tennessee Senate in 1878 and 1879, and served as its presiding officer in 1879.

Neal was elected as a Democrat to the Forty-ninth and Fiftieth Congresses. He served from March 4, 1885, to March 3, 1889,  but declined to be a candidate for renomination in 1888 on account of ill health.

Death
Neal died at Rhea Springs, Tennessee, in Rhea County on March 26, 1889 (age 52 years, 120 days).  He is interred at the W.F. Brown family cemetery in Post Oak Springs, Roane County, Tennessee.

References

External links

1836 births
1889 deaths
Democratic Party members of the Tennessee House of Representatives
Democratic Party Tennessee state senators
Democratic Party members of the United States House of Representatives from Tennessee
19th-century American politicians
People from Anderson County, Tennessee
People from Athens, Tennessee